James G. Nunn (born 4 April 1993) is a British actor. He is best known for appearing in The Imitation Game alongside Benedict Cumberbatch and Keira Knightley. Nunn has also played many notable theatre roles on London stages and around the United Kingdom.

Career
Nunn attended Davenant Foundation School, where he performed in school productions. He was elected as the Student Representative on the governing body of the school and also served as its Head Boy. He was part of the stage and technical crew, and after leaving school he worked as a performing arts technician before beginning his professional acting career at age 19.

Nunn landed his first feature film role in London Wall, which was a play in London's West End before being turned into a film, in which played the role of Oswald Birkenshaw. In the same year, Nunn signed with his first agent. He went on to work with Benedict Cumberbatch and Keira Knightley on the Oscar-, Golden Globe-, and BAFTA-nominated film The Imitation Game, directed by Morten Tyldum. He is also known for his portrayal of Will Scarlet in Robin Hood: The Rebellion alongside Ben Freeman (Robin Hood), Brian Blessed (Friar Tuck) and Kristian Nairn (Thomas) mostly known for playing Hodor in Game of Thrones. His most notable TV appearance was as Peter Manuel in season 4 of Murder Maps, The Beast Of Birkenshaw.

As well as his film career Nunn is also a regular on stage. His role as Romeo in Romeo & Juliet at the Rose Playhouse in London earned a 'Best Male Performance' Nomination at the Off West End Theatre Awards. His role as Parson Lucy in Matilda Ibini's critically acclaimed play Muscovado (winner of the Alfred Fagon Audience Award) was very well received. He has toured the country with a number of productions, including playing Claudio in Much Ado About Nothing.

Filmography

References

External links 
 
 James G. Nunn on Twitter

1993 births
Living people